Tengen is a town in the district of Konstanz, in Baden-Württemberg, Germany.

Verenahof
Verenahof (also known as Büttenharter Hof or Verenahöfe) was a German exclave in Switzerland, administratively part of the German town of Wiechs am Randen (which is now part of the town of Tengen). Geographically, it was separated from Wiechs am Randen by a 200–300-metre wide strip of Swiss territory.

By 1964 a treaty was concluded between Germany and Switzerland, which entered into force on 4 October 1967. The 43-hectare territory, containing three houses and eleven West German citizens, became part of Switzerland.

Mayors
From 1973 to 2015 Helmut Groß was the mayor of Tengen. His successor is Marian Schreier.

 1973–2015: Helmut Groß (born 1948 in Crailsheim)
 since May 2015: Marian Schreier (born 1990 in Stuttgart; SPD)

Education
Tengen has a primary school (Grund- u. Werkrealschule Tengen) and a library/school library.

Sons and daughters of the town
 Leutnant Hermann Pfeiffer (1890 in Tengen – 1917 in France) was a World War I flying ace credited with eleven aerial victories
 Otto Sauter (born 1961), piccolo trumpeter, especially in baroque music

See also
 Verenahof

References

1651 disestablishments
Konstanz (district)
States and territories established in the 11th century
Hegau
Counties of the Holy Roman Empire